BBC One's New Year's Eve specials have aired in varying formats; in 2000, and since 2004, they prominently feature live coverage of London's New Year's Eve festivities, including the midnight bongs of Big Ben, and the fireworks show on the River Thames and London Eye.

For 2000, the BBC led the global 2000 Today consortium, which televised coverage of New Year's events from around the world, and served as the host broadcaster for coverage of festivities from the United Kingdom. In 2004, the BBC began to broadcast New Year Live, which primarily featured live reports from the South Bank to cover the countdown to midnight. From 2006 to 2009, the special also featured music performances.

Beginning in 2014, BBC One began to air concert specials as part of its New Year's Eve programming. The specials are divided into two parts, with an intermission approaching midnight for the live broadcast of the London fireworks.

Other BBC channels also air New Year's Eve specials; since 1993, BBC Two has aired Jools' Annual Hootenanny—a concert special spun off from Later... with Jools Holland, while BBC One Scotland opts out to air Hogmanay (formerly Hogmanay Live), a special from Glasgow themed around Scotland's Hogmanay festivities.

Format

2000: 2000 Today 
For 1999–2000, the BBC broadcast 2000 Today, a telecast covering global New Year's Eve festivities marking the arrival of the year 2000. The telecast was produced as part of a global consortium led by the BBC and WGBH, and was designated as one of five projects undertaken by the broadcaster to mark the arrival of the 21st century. The special would feature coverage of the opening of the Millennium Dome, and London's New Year's fireworks show on the South Bank.

Alongside the television broadcast, BBC Radio 1 aired One World, an international electronic music event featuring DJ sets by Carl Cox (who would begin the event from Australia during a special Radio 1 Breakfast, and then be the final performer in Honolulu, Hawaii on the morning of 1 January, UK time), Dance Anthems host Dave Pearce (who would host a show from Glasgow for the countdown to midnight UK time), Pete Tong, Paul Oakenfold, and Fatboy Slim among others. Emma B and Scott Mills hosted the main block of the event, Millennium Dance Party, which ran through the evening of 31 December to the following morning.

2004–2013: New Year Live 
The programme initially covered the New Year's Eve fireworks in London in 2004. In 2005, the format changed to include commentary from celebrity guests. The format changed further in 2006, to include live performances from music artists and the programme was extended to air for between 60 and 90 minutes. This format remained until 2009.

From 2009 until 2013, the programme returned to its original format of one presenter interviewing the general public on the streets of London, leading into the New Year Fireworks.

2014–present: Concert specials and New Year's Eve Fireworks 
Beginning in 2013, BBC One began to air concert specials from Central Hall Westminster on New Year's Eve; the specials are divided into two parts, with a segment featuring live coverage of midnight celebrations from London (billed in programme guides as New Year's Eve Fireworks) airing in between. The first special, Gary Barlow's Big Ben Bash, was headlined by Gary Barlow.

During the 2014 event, drones were used to film the firework display. For the 2016 and 2017 events, the firework display was also streamed in 360-degree video.

Due to the COVID-19 pandemic in the United Kingdom, the London fireworks were cancelled as a public event in 2021 and 2022. For 2020, BBC One's New Year's Eve programming was promoted under the blanket title The Big New Year's In. It included a titular special hosted by Paddy McGuinness and Maya Jama, a New Year's Eve edition of The Graham Norton Show, the concert special Alicia Keys Rocks New Year's Eve (which was filmed in Los Angeles), and a broadcast-only countdown event from London.

The previous concert format returned for 2022, with BBC One airing The Big New Years & Years Party. At this point the special began to be filmed at Riverside Studios in Hammersmith. London's New Year's Eve fireworks were once again conducted as a "live broadcast spectacular" for BBC One (similar to the previous year, which included an appearance by Giles Terera, and a performance by the West End Musical Choir at Shakespeare's Globe), with the city having cancelled a planned in-person celebration at Trafalgar Square due to COVID-19-related concerns.

Ratings 

The first show in 2004/05 attracted 6.35 million viewers, growing to 6.43 million for 2005/06. Ratings dropped to 6 million for 2007's arrival, but peaked with 9.6 million viewers at midnight. The 2007/08 show dropped to a new low of 5.35 million viewers, then 5.83 million in 2009. The show changed to a 11.45–12.15 slot for 2010's arrival, with 7.65 million watching, peaking at more than 10 million. The 2011 show grew to 9.3 million viewers watching, peaking at more than 11 million at midnight. 2012 was the most-watched edition so far, at 10.6 million, peaking at more than 12 million viewers. The 2013 show got 9.7 million, with 13.3 million at midnight.

As the show changed again to a concert, the fireworks achieved success with 13.52 million, peaking at 14.1 million. Gary Barlow's concert afterwards was boosted to 10 million viewers, dipping to 8.8 million. For 2015 the fireworks had 12.5 million viewers, and Queen + Adam Lambert's concert 10 million, dipping to 9.4 million. Viewers dropped in 2016 to 11.4 million, but Bryan Adams' concert pulled in strong ratings, getting over 6 million. 2017's arrival saw a drop to 10.8 million, while 2018 had 10.4 million. However, for the first time since 2015's arrival, the 2019 show got more than 11 million, at 12.3 million.

Broadcasts 
The programme is broadcast on BBC One in England, Wales and Northern Ireland whilst BBC Scotland's Hogmanay airs on BBC One Scotland with celebrations based in Edinburgh. Both, however, are available to watch anywhere in the United Kingdom on digital television and online on BBC iPlayer.

Presenters and guests

Notes and references

Notes

References

External links
 
 New Year's Eve Fireworks

BBC Television shows
British television specials
New Year's television specials
Annual television shows
Annual events in the United Kingdom
2004 British television series debuts